Max Rafeek Basheer  (born 9 May 1927) is a former administrator with the South Australian National Football League (SANFL). He was involved in a number of keys decisions affecting the SANFL from the 1970s to the 1990s, ultimately leading to the inclusion of two South Australian sides in the Australian Football League (AFL).

Born in 1927 to Lebanese immigrants, in the early 1950s Basheer was a state amateur rover who was denied a SANFL League football career when North Adelaide refused to clear him to Sturt.

Basheer's administrative football career began in 1954 when he served as an honorary solicitor to the South Australian Amateur Football League and as a Commissioner to the League's Tribunal.

In what was probably his most celebrated contribution to the sport, Basheer served as vice president and president of the South Australian National Football League from 1967 to 2003. This was a period in which, over and above the usual administrative tasks, he oversaw:
 the building of Football Park (AAMI Stadium);
 the installation of lights to the stadium – which took 6½ years and involved a Royal Commission;and
 the introduction of South Australia's two AFL teams, Adelaide and Port Adelaide.

The Max Basheer Reserve, which adjoins AAMI Stadium, was named in honour of Basheer's contribution to the game. He also has the Max Basheer Stand in the stadium named after him.

Football highlights 
ADMINISTRATION RECORD :
South Australian Amateur League Commissioner 1954–1960
SANFL Commissioner 1962–1966
SANFL Senior Vice President 1967–1978
SANFL Management Committee (Chairman 1978/79) 1969–1979
SANFL Commissioner for Country and Junior Football (chairman 1978 ) 1971–1978
Football Park Finance and Development Committee (chairman 1978) 1975–1989
SANFL President (25 years longest serving president) 1978–2003
Foundation SA – Trustee 1988 1992
SA Football Commission – chairman 1990–2003
Australian Football Hall of Fame Committee 1996–2002
SA Football Hall of Fame Committee 2001–present

ACHIEVEMENTS :
Awarded SANFL Life Membership 1972
Member of the Order of Australia for services to the game of Australian Football 1988
Awarded AFL Life membership 1996
Inducted to the SANFL Hall of Fame In 2003
Inducted to the Australian Football Hall of Fame – the first South Australian football administrator so honoured

Other 
Max Basheer is also a successful lawyer. A graduate of the University of Adelaide Law School, Basheer was admitted to the Bar in 1951. For almost four decades, from 1954 to 1992, Basheer was a partner (1954–66) then senior partner (1966–92) with the law firm Povey Waterhouse & Basheer. In 1992, Basheer became a partner with Reilly Basheer Downs & Humphries and later worked as a consultant with Duncan Basheer Hannon.

As well as his professional legal career, Basheer is the Director of Basheers Strathmore Hotel P/L; Chairman of Directors of the Woodville Hotel P/L; and Chairman of Directors of Samarkand P/L.

External links
 South Australian Multicultural & Ethnic Affairs Commission Newsletter December 2005
 ABC interview upon retirement
SANFL Hall of Fame

References

1927 births
Living people
Australian people of Lebanese descent
Sportspeople of Lebanese descent
Australian Football Hall of Fame inductees
20th-century Australian lawyers
South Australian National Football League administrators
South Australian Football Hall of Fame inductees
Members of the Order of Australia